Bill Unwin (25 November 1915 – 16 June 1999) was an Australian rules footballer who played with Collingwood in the Victorian Football League (VFL).

Notes

External links 

Profile at Collingwood Forever

1915 births
1999 deaths
Australian rules footballers from Victoria (Australia)
Collingwood Football Club players